Lagoa Dourada is a Brazilian municipality located in the state of Minas Gerais. 

It is the national capital of the Swiss roll, locally called rocambole.

Geography 
According to IBGE (2017), the municipality belongs to the Immediate Geographic Region of São João del-Rei, in the Intermediate Geographic Region of Barbacena.

Ecclesiastical circumscription 
The municipality is part of the Roman Catholic Diocese of São João del-Rei.

Demography

Population 
In 2020, the estimated population was 13,063.

See also
 List of municipalities in Minas Gerais

References

Municipalities in Minas Gerais